The South Yorkshire Way is the name for two interlinked Long Distance footpaths in the county of South Yorkshire. The Boundary Route is a  route around the outskirts of the county, whilst the Central Route is a  route through the heart of the county. Both trails start and end at the same points; Thorne North railway station and Dore & Totley railway station.

They were devised by Andrew White in 2014 to commemorate the 40th anniversary of the formation of South Yorkshire as a county.

Background
The county of South Yorkshire is often overlooked for walking in preference to the more famous areas of the Yorkshire Dales and the North York Moors, with many walkers preferring the hilly terrain of those areas to the more flatter landscapes of South Yorkshire. Walker and writer Andrew White, who was born and bred in South Yorkshire, first had the idea for a circular walk around the county in 2009, as a way to encourage more visitors to the area. As White was the editor of Walks Around Britain, he put his thoughts about the possibility of creating a new long-distance walking trail in South Yorkshire on the website, which was picked up by BBC Radio Sheffield's Rony Robinson, who invited Andrew onto his mid-morning programme to talk about the new trail - which at this point was still very much a basic route.

Encouraged by the support from the listeners, White worked on a route around the boundary of the county, with a view to launching it in April 2014 - the 40th anniversary of the formation of South Yorkshire as a county, with the creation of the Metropolitan county in 1974 as part of the Local Government Act 1972.

The route linked up existing public footpaths and bridleways to make a 171 mile trail around the outskirts of South Yorkshire, with White trying to remain within South Yorkshire and to stick to the boundary as much as possible, and routing the trail through as many places of interest as he could.  The first draft route was finished in January 2014.

White discovered that in planning the circular route, there were many places of interest in the centre of the county he couldn't bring into a boundary walk - so decided to devise a further trail - the 98 mile Central Route - to take in those central places; the original trail re-named the Boundary Route  with the two trails meeting at points in the east and west.

The routes of the two trails are available as GPX files for walkers to follow, as the trails aren't currently waymarked for their entire length. White has stated his aim is to get the routes fully waymarked and recognised on Ordnance Survey maps. 

Andrew White stated on his Twitter account he'd be finally writing a guidebook to accompany the two trails ready for the tenth anniversary of South Yorkshire Way, in 2024.

Central Route
The Central Route of the South Yorkshire Way passes close to or through the following places of interest:

 Hatfield Water Park
 St Lawrence's Church, Hatfield
 Doncaster Racecourse
 Cast
 Doncaster Mansion House
 Doncaster Minster
 Conisbrough Castle
 St Peter's Church, Conisbrough
 Thrybergh Country Park
 RSPB Dearne Valley Old Moor
 Monk Bretton Priory
 Dearne Valley Park
 Wentworth Castle
 Worsbrough Mill
 Elsecar Heritage Centre
 Needle's Eye
 Wentworth Woodhouse
 Keppel's Column
 Rotherham Minster
 Clifton Park and Museum
 River Don
 Sheffield Manor Lodge
 Sheffield Cathedral
 Sheffield City Hall
 Endcliffe Park
 Ecclesall Woods
 Beauchief Abbey

Boundary Route
The Boundary Route of the South Yorkshire Way passes close to or through the following places of interest:

 Sheffield and South Yorkshire Navigation Canal
 St Cuthbert's Church, Fishlake
 Norton Priory
 Campsall Country Park
 Robin_Hood's Well
 Brodsworth Hall
 Hooton Pagnall Hall
 Hooton_Pagnell Wood
 Howell Wood Country Park
 Notton Wood Nature Reserve
 Cawthorne Park
 Cannon Hall
 Cannon Hall Farm
 Scout Dike Reservoir
 Dunford Bridge
 Woodhead Tunnels
 Hingcliffe Common
 Howden Edge
 High Stones
 Howden Reservoir
 Cartledge Stones Ridge
 Strines Reservoir
 Stanage Edge
 Robin Hood's Cave
 Cowper Stone
 Fiddler's Elbow
 Higger Tor
 Fox House Inn
 Totley Brook
 Beauchief Abbey
 Graves Park
 Rother Valley Country Park
 Nor Wood
 Harthill Reservoir
 the former RAF Firbeck
 Roche Abbey
 Tickhill Castle
 No. 1 Yorkshire
 St Nicholas' Church, Bawtry
 Bawtry Hall
 Austerfield
 Doncaster Sheffield Airport
 Hatfield Chase
 Humberhead Levels

Connecting trails
Both the Boundary Route and the Central Route use part of the existing Trans Pennine Trail where the routes meet.

References

External links
 South Yorkshire Way – official site
 South Yorkshire Way – official YouTube channel
 Boundary Route - The Long Distance Walkers Association
 Central Route - The Long Distance Walkers Association
 Open Walks

Footpaths in South Yorkshire
Footpaths in West Yorkshire
Long-distance footpaths in England